Underwater Sunlight is the twenty-ninth major release and sixteenth studio album by electronic artists Tangerine Dream.

This album marked the first appearance of Paul Haslinger.

"Underwater Sunlight" spent one week on the UK Albums Chart at No.97.

Track listing

Singles
Dolphin Dance

Personnel
 Edgar Froese — Synthesizer, guitar
 Christopher Franke — Synthesizer, electronic percussion
 Paul Haslinger — Synthesizer, grand piano, guitar
 Christian Gstettner — Computer programming
 Monica Froese — Cover photography

References

External links
 

1986 albums
Tangerine Dream albums
Jive Records albums